Pandalosia ephamilla is a species of minute sea snail, a marine gastropod mollusk or micromollusk in the family Zebinidae.

Description

Distribution
This species occurs in the Red Sea and off New Zealand.

References

 Watson R. B. (1886). Report on the Scaphopoda and Gasteropoda collected by HMS Challenger during the years 1873-1876. Reports of the scientific results of the voyage of H.M.S. "Challenger", Zoology : 15 (part 42): 1-756, pl. 1-50 and Caecidae pl. 1-3
 Baker F., Hanna G.D. & Strong A.M. (1930) Some rissoid Mollusca from the Gulf of California. Proceedings of the California Academy of Sciences, ser. 4, 19(4): 23-40, pl. 1. [Published 15 July 1930] page(s): 30, pl. 1 fig. 15
 Vine, P. (1986). Red Sea Invertebrates. Immel Publishing, London. 224 pp
 Sleurs W.J.M. (1989) A zoogeographical analysis of the rissoinine fauna of the eastern Pacific with special reference to a comparison with the Caribbean fauna and with a checklist of the eastern Pacific Rissoininae Stimpson, 1865 (Mollusca: Gastropoda). Annales de la Société Royale Zoologique de Belgique 119(2): 155-164.
 Ponder W. F. (1985) A review of the genera of the Rissoidae (Mollusca: Mesogastropoda: Rissoacea). Records of the Australian Museum supplement 4: 1-221
 Faber, M. & K. Kaiser. (2015). The Rissoinidae of Île Clipperton in the tropical eastern Pacific (Mollusca. Gastropoda). Miscellanea Malacologica. 7, 19-23

External links
 

Zebinidae
Gastropods described in 1886
Molluscs of New Zealand